Mats Ola Oldin Svensson (born 6 April 1964) is a Swedish former football defender. He represented the Sweden Olympic team at the 1988 Summer Olympics.

Honours 
IFK Göteborg

 Allsvenskan: 1990, 1991, 1993
 Svenska Cupen: 1991
Individual
 Årets Ärkeängel: 1990

References

1964 births
Living people
Swedish footballers
Halmstads BK players
IFK Göteborg players
Association football defenders
Allsvenskan players
Sweden under-21 international footballers